Brooklyn Community Board 10 is a New York City community board that encompasses the Brooklyn neighborhoods of Bay Ridge, Dyker Heights, and Fort Hamilton. It is delimited by Upper New York Bay on the west, Bay Ridge R.R. Yards and Long Island Rail Road on the north, 14th Avenue and Bay 8th Street on the east, as well as by Lower New York Bay on the south.

Its current chairman (2009) is Dean Rasinya, Vice Chair Mary Ann Walsh, Secretary Ron Gross, Treasurer Brian Kieran and its district manager Josephine Beckmann.

As of the United States Census, 2000, the Community Board has a population of 122,542, up from 110,612 in 1990 and 118,188 in 1980.

Of them (as of 2000), 84,120 (68.6%) are White non Hispanic, 1,402 (1.1%) are African-American, 17,546 (14.3%) Asian or Pacific Islander, 115 (0.1%) American Indian or Native Alaskan, 352 (0.3%) of some other race, 5,611 (4.6%) of two or more race, 13,396 (10.9%) of Hispanic origins.

22.7% of the population benefit from public assistance as of 2004, up from 10.9% in 2000.

References

External links
Profile of the Community Board (PDF)
Brooklyn neighborhood map

Community boards of Brooklyn
Bay Ridge, Brooklyn